Barry John Lee (born 17 August 1944 in Wisbech), nicknamed "Leapy" or "No 351", is a British racing driver who has been successful in many areas of motor sport. He started as a jockey, and then a speedway rider for Hackney and then moved into autocross, rallying and rallycross. His greatest successes were in short oval hot rod racing where he won four world titles.
After retiring from short oval racing Barry moved into raid rallying, making three attempts (1987-1989) at the Paris-Dakar Rally with Ted Toleman. In 1994 he won the inaugural Eurocar V6 Saloon Car Championship. He successfully defended the title in 1995 before moving into the new V8 Championship in 1996.  Barry has also competed in the British Saloon Car Championship and the British Truck Racing Championship.

In short oval racing Lee notched up over 1400 wins, a number that Motorsport magazine described as "never likely to be bettered".

Major Titles Won

Autocross
1966 Players Autocross Champion

Rallycross
1978 BTRDA Rallycross Champion

Hot Rod Racing
World Champion 1973, 1974, 1977, 1978
European Champion 1974, 1975
National Champion 1972, 1975 
Grand Prix / NHRPA Series Winner 1978, 1980 
Spedeworth National Points Champion 1972, 1973, 1974, 1975, 1978, 1983
British Champion 1971, 1972, 1977, 1981 
English Champion 1974, 1975, 1976, 1979, 1980

Eurocar V6 Saloon Championship
1994 Champion
1995 Champion

Author
Barry has written two books on hot rod racing (see below) and was also a columnist for various motor racing magazines over the years, including Oval News, Auto Enthusiast and Rods & Stocks International. He has also commentated on hot rod racing for Sky Sports.

The Barry Lee Book of Hot Rod Racing (1972)
The Barry Lee Guide to Hot Rod Racing (1979)

In 2013 Lee released his autobiography, The Other Side of Winning.

Racing record

Complete British Saloon Car Championship results
(key) (Races in bold indicate pole position; races in italics indicate fastest lap.)

References

1944 births
British Touring Car Championship drivers
English racing drivers
Living people